Day of the Russian Navy is national holiday in the Russian Federation and a senior holiday in the Russian Armed Forces. The day honors the sailors in units of the Russian Navy and its specialized arms (Naval Aviation and the Coastal Troops consisting of the Naval Infantry and the Coastal Missile and Artillery Troops). It is celebrated annually, on the last Sunday of July.

History 

The original version of the Russian Navy was founded in 1696 for the Tsardom of Russia. In the Soviet Union, Navy Day was established by a decree of the Council of People's Commissars of the USSR and the Central Committee of the VKPB of June 22, 1939 in June 1939; in connection with the Battle of Gangut. The holiday was canceled on October 1, 1980 by the Presidium of the Supreme Soviet. By the Decree of the President of Russia Vladimir Putin, Navy Day was reestablished.

Main Naval Parade 

Russia celebrates Navy Day with a 2-hour fleet review in St. Petersburg near the Neva River and the Port of Kronstadt, commonly known as the Main Naval Parade. It was established by order of President Vladimir Putin on July 27, 2017 as the principal anniversary event in connection with Navy Day celebrations. According to Putin, the idea was conceived while he was reading historical literature on his Ilyushin presidential plane, during which he came across an article about a naval parade in Kronstadt during the Imperial era, after which he called Defense Minister Sergey Shoygu to order him to organize a similar type of event. The parade features ships and marine air force units from the Baltic, Black Sea, Northern and Pacific Fleets as well as the Caspian Flotilla. The naval parade starts at 11:00 AM, with the Commander-in-Chief of the Russian Navy (currently Admiral Nikolai Yevmenov) being the ceremonial commander of the fleet review formation. Holiday commemorative naval parades by ground units and fleet reviews are also held at naval bases all over the country, such as Sevastopol, Kaliningrad, Vladivostok, Severomorsk and Astrakhan. In 2020, a Naval Parade was held in the Dagestani city of Kaspiysk. Parades are also held by the Russian naval facility in Tartus in Syria. All commanders of the regional parades must report to the Commander-in-Chief of the Russian Navy before commencing their own parades via video conferencing.

The fleet inspection segment begins when the President leaves the Peter and Paul Fortress aboard a presidential review yacht following the inspection of a guard of honor platoon and the Admiralty Navy Band, together with the Commander in Chief of the Navy and the Minister of Defense, to review a number of stationed vessels representing each of the fleets and the surface and submarine forces of the Navy as a whole docked on the Neva River. Each of the ship's company contingents of the vessels taking part in the presidential inspection, as well as the officers and staff of each ship, salutes the President with eyes right.

A separate ceremony on Senate Square in the presence of the President of Russia then follows, involving Russian military bands and honour guards, plus a number of personnel of the Navy assembled. The ceremony also includes a flag raising ceremony and the presidential holiday address to the nation and the service personnel of the Navy, following which the National Anthem of Russia is played with the firing of a 21-gun salute. The much awaited fleet review segment follows, ending with a flypast of naval aviation and in 2021 a marchpast of naval personnel.

In 2019, the holiday's national fleet review was for the first time in many years attended by naval combat ships from China, India, Vietnam and the Philippines as well as military bands from Thailand and Vietnam that  performed with the Central Navy Band of Russia. Foreign ships such as the Chinese missile destroyer Xi'an and the BRP Davao del Sur (LD-602) took part. In Sevastopol, the raising of the flag of the Russian Imperial Navy battleship Imperatritsa Mariya took place during the parade in the presence of Prime Minister Dmitry Medvedev. This was done to commemorate the 80th anniversary of the founding of the Day of the Soviet Navy.

The 2020 celebrations marked the 75th anniversary of the end of the Second World War and the bicentennial of the First Russian Antarctic Expedition. In honor of the former, the parade was closed out with  the Alexey Barinov and D-178 landing boats with Katyusha rocket launchers and a T-34 tank aboard, along soldiers dressed in Red Army uniforms and a Soviet naval flag. In the parade speech, President Putin announced that the navy would be armed with hypersonic nuclear strike weapons. The Ukrainian government sent a letter to António Guterres, the Secretary General of the United Nations, in protest of the organization of a naval parade in Sevastopol, which is located in a region that Ukraine says is occupied. On the eve of this letter, the Ukrainian Foreign Ministry sent a similar note of protest to their Russian counterparts.

The Royal Danish Navy often monitors Russian ships moving through Danish territorial waters to get to the parade to prevent incidents at sea.

Navy Day reception 
An official reception is held after the parade at the Admiralty building near the Admiralty Embankment. It usually involves the President of Russia, the Minister of Defence, the Navy Chief and all military leaders from the navy, the Ground Forces and the Aerospace Forces. All foreign military delegations and veterans of the Soviet/Russian naval services are in attendance as well. The highlight of the reception is the speech by the president directly to those in attendance.

Other celebrations 
In 2020, as a result of the COVID-19 pandemic in Russia and the postponement of the 2020 Moscow Victory Day Parade, the Immortal Regiment march, which was supposed to be held on 9 May, was also postponed and was announced to be held on Navy Day in a videoconference with President Putin and Minister of Defence Sergey Shoygu. These plans were later scrapped and the march was postponed until 2021. That same year, ahead of Navy Day celebrations, an all-female navy crew was deployed to patrol the Black Sea for the first time.

Gallery

See also 
 Public holidays in Russia
 Navy Day (Ukraine)
 Navy Day (Turkmenistan)

References

External links
 Official Website of the Main Naval Parade

Russian Navy
Recurring events established in 1939
1939 establishments in Russia
Public holidays in Russia